Nonoai is a neighbourhood (bairro) in the city of Porto Alegre, the state capital of Rio Grande do Sul, in Brazil. It was created by Law 2022 on December 7, 1959.

Famous residents
 Iberê Camargo, painter

References

External links
 Porto Alegre City Homepage

Neighbourhoods in Porto Alegre